Little Red Decides is a 1918 American silent drama film directed by Jack Conway and starring Frederick Vroom, Jean Hersholt and Alice Davenport.

Cast
 Barbara Connolly as Little Red
 Goro Kino as Duck Sing
 Frederick Vroom as Col. Ferdinand Aliso
 Jack Curtis as Tom Gilroy
 Walter Perry as Two Pair Smith
 Jean Hersholt as Sour Milk
 Frank MacQuarrie as Parson Jones
 Nellie Anderson as Mrs. Jones
 Margaret Cullington as Miss Hanly
 Alice Davenport as Widow Bolton
 Maude Handforth as Eliza Squires
 Percy Challenger as Little Doc
 George Pearce as Dr. Kirk
 Curley Baldwin as Foreman
 Betty Pearce as Miss Wattles

References

Bibliography
 James Robert Parish & Michael R. Pitts. Film directors: a guide to their American films. Scarecrow Press, 1974.

External links
 

1918 films
1918 drama films
1910s English-language films
American silent feature films
Silent American drama films
Films directed by Jack Conway
American black-and-white films
Triangle Film Corporation films
1910s American films